The World of Us is a 2016 South Korean drama film written and directed by Yoon Ga-eun in her feature-length directorial debut. The film was released in South Korea on June 16, 2016.

Premise
The film centers around Sun (Choi Soo-in), an elementary school girl and social outcast who befriends a transfer student named Jia (Seol Hye-in) during a summer vacation. When the new semester begins, their new friendship is put to test as Sun and Jia are subject to bullying and internal problems. Will they be able to get past their boundaries?

Cast
Choi Soo-in as Sun
Seol Hye-in as Ji-ah
Lee Seo-yeon as Bo-ra  
Kang Min-joon as Yoon
Kim Hee-joon as Eun-joo 
Kim Chae-yeon as Tae-yeon
Jang Hye-jin as Mom 
Son Suk-bae as Dad

Release 
On June 16, 2016, it was released on 136 screens in Korea through At9 Film. In Japan, it was opened in 30 halls, starting with S&B Garden Cinema on September 23, 2017.

Home media 
The World of Us was released on DVD on February 16, 2017. Afterwards, on December 20, 2018, a Blu-ray disc composed of two discs was released through an android. DVDs and Blu-ray Discs include commentaries and supplementary videos.

Assessment

Box-office 
As of April 19, 2021, it recorded 51,008 audiences and 378,320,114 won in sales.

Awards and nominations

References

External links

The World of Us at Naver Movies 

South Korean drama films
2016 films
Films about children
2016 drama films
2016 directorial debut films
2010s South Korean films
2010s Korean-language films